Castellini is an Italian surname. Notable people with the surname include:

Antonio Castellini (1951–1976), Italian boxer
Bob Castellini, American businessman
Caterina Amigoni Castellini (18th century), Italian pastellist living in Spain
Claudio Castellini (born 1966), Italian comics artist
Giacomo Castellini, Italian Baroque painter
Gianluca Castellini (died 1510), Roman Catholic Bishop of Catanzaro
Jean Castellini (born 1968), Monegasque businessman and civil servant
Julien Castellini (born 1975), Monegasque alpine skier
Luca Castellini or Lucas Castellini (died 1631), Roman Catholic prelate 
Luciano Castellini (born 1945), Italian footballer and manager
Marcello Castellini (born 1973), Italian footballer
Miguel Angel Castellini (born 1947), Argentine boxer
Paolo Castellini (born 1979), Italian footballer
Raffaelle Castellini (died 1864), Italian artist

Italian-language surnames